Locarno is a town in Switzerland.

Locarno may also refer to:

Places 
 Locarno District, Ticino, Switzerland
 Locarno Beach, in Vancouver, British Columbia, Canada
 Locarno Dam, in Ticino, Switzerland
 Locarno Mine, in California, United States

Other uses 
 Locarno (Bristol), now O2 Academy Bristol, a music venue
 Locarno (typeface)
 1937 Locarno, a minor planet
 FC Locarno, a Swiss football club
 Locarno Airport, in Switzerland
 Locarno Ballroom, in Glasgow, Scotland
 Locarno Festival, a Swiss film festival
 Locarno railway station, in Switzerland
 Locarno Treaties, concluded 1925
 Locarno Dance Hall, a dance hall in Manchester mentioned in The Specials song "Friday Night and Saturday Morning" and appearing in the film Billy Liar